René Orlando Meléndez Brito (born 29 December 1928 – 14 November 2002) was a Chilean footballer.

He is well known in the Chilean football for be a key player in Everton de Viña del Mar’s two first league title obtention as well as who obtained the 1952 league top-scorer award after netting 30 goals.

Honours

Club
Everton
 Primera División de Chile (2): 1950, 1952

Unión La Calera
 Segunda División de Chile: 1961

References

1928 births
2002 deaths
Chilean Primera División players
Everton de Viña del Mar footballers
Universidad de Chile footballers
O'Higgins F.C. footballers
Unión La Calera footballers
Deportes Colchagua footballers
Luis Cruz Martínez footballers
Association football forwards
Chilean footballers